Mai (c.1751 – late 1779), known as Omai in Britain, was a young Ra'iatean man who became the second Pacific Islander to visit Europe, after Ahu-toru who was brought to Paris by Bougainville in 1768.

Life 
Ma'i, born c.1751, described himself as a hoa, or 'attendant upon the king', the son of a Ra'iatea landowner.  His father was killed by Puni's Borabora warriors.  Fleeing to Tahiti, Ma'i was wounded in the encounter with the Dolphin in 1767.  Ma'i then became an apprentice to a priest.  Returning to Ra'iatea, he was captured and taken to Borabora.  Narrowly escaping death there, he escaped to Huahine.

Omai met Samuel Wallis in 1767 and Captain James Cook in 1769 in Tahiti. In August 1773 he embarked from Huahine on the British ship , commanded by Tobias Furneaux, which had previously touched at Tahiti as part of Cook's second voyage of discovery in the Pacific. Omai travelled to Europe on Adventure, arriving at London in October 1774 where he was introduced into British society by the naturalist Sir Joseph Banks (whom he had also met during Cook's first voyage).

During his two-year stay in England, Omai became much admired within London high society.  Renowned for his charm, quick wit and exotic good looks, he quickly became a favourite of the aristocratic elite.  Banks regularly invited Omai to dine with the Royal Society and arranged meetings with notable celebrities, including Lord Sandwich, Dr Samuel Johnson, Frances Burney, and Anna Seward, among others.  Richard Holmes remarks that Omai's idiosyncratic behaviour and distinctive bow were widely celebrated.  Indeed, during one famed meeting with King George III at Kew, Omai is said to have delivered his bow then grasped the King's hand, declaring, "How do, King Tosh!"

He was painted by Sir Joshua Reynolds, among others; Portrait of Omai sold in 2001 for "the second highest price ever paid for a British picture", according to the Antiques Trade Gazette. Omai's journey to England and subsequent return to Tahiti with Cook's third voyage in 1776 became the subject of a theatrical production, written and directed by the dramatist John O'Keefe, entitled Omai – A Voyage ‘round the World that was performed during the 1785 Christmas season at the Theatre Royal in Covent Garden.

Omai returned to Huahine in August 1777 and was settled with a European-style house, furniture, vineyard and two Maori boys as his servants. During the Bounty's visit to Tahiti in 1789, Captain Bligh was told Omai had died about two and a half years after Cook's departure in November 1777 – Omai died in late 1779.

References

Further reading

External links
Omai, Captain Cook Birthplace Museum website

Raiatean explorers
Polynesian explorers of the Pacific
1750s births
1780 deaths
James Cook